Franz Bucher (born 15 January 1940) is a Swiss artist. He has produced paintings, drawings, woodcuts, etchings, sculptural objects, reliefs, murals, and stained glass.

Biography

Early life and education
Franz Bucher was born in 1940 in Sarnen, Obwalden, Switzerland. He attended schools in Sarnen and St. Michael's College, Zug. From 1957 to 1962, he worked as a painter and decorator. During this time, he worked in places such as Lucerne, Basel and Zürich. Following this, he studied at the Arts-&-Crafts School and at the High School for Applied Arts in Basel and Lucerne. In 1965 he received the Scholarship  of the Canton Obwalden. During his time at these schools, Bucher submitted his first works to exhibitions.

Career
In 1967 Bucher was awarded an Art Teaching Certificate. He married Pia Heer in the same year and moved house to Zug. There, he began teaching art part-time at St. Michael's College and Dr. Pfister's School in Oberägeri until 1967. During this period, he also took extended journeys in Europe and Africa. Bucher had three children of his four children between 1968 and 1971; Peter was born in 1968, Christian was born in 1069 and Claudia born in 1971. Bucher's fourth child, Simon, was born in 1977. Between 1971 and 1991, he was a member of the Funerary Art Committee of the City of Zug. From 1971 to 1989, he was also a member of the Association of Zug Artists.

Between 1972 and 1983, Bucher was awarded scholarships by the Swiss Federal Art Awards three times: in 1972, 1974, and 1975. In 1972, he moved house to Horw. In 1973, he became a residentiary student at the Swiss Institute in Rome. Also in this year he became a member of the SWB (Swiss Handiwork League) which he left in 1981. Bucher was appointed lecturer for Design and Art Didactics at St.Michael's Teachers’ Training College in 1974. This was a position which he maintained until 2003.

In 1975, Bucher was admitted to the Sektion Zentralschweiz der Visarte, and in 1976 to the Xylon CH, Internatio¬nal Association of Woodcutters. Then in 1978 he was admitted to the Working Group of the St. Luke's Society of Switzerland (SSL).

1984–1993
Purchase of a studio-home on the lake of Sarnen, Hostettstrasse 34 in CH-Wilen (1984). In the same year: „Premio Regione Sarda“ of the 2nd. International Graphics Biennial, Cagliari. 1985-1995: Activity as committee member of the SSL. 1986-1993: Temporary Artists’ Collective for the travelling exhibition with 8 artists of the St. Luke's Society: From Tower to Fountain.  Premio Milano Capitale dell’Arte – Artista dell’ Anno 1988,  Istituto d’Arte Contemporanea Milano. 1990: Admitted to the Gesellschaft Schweizericher Bergmaler (GSB). After the Review Exhibition 1985 in the Bündner Kunstmuseum Chur, large individual travelling exhibition as retrospective in Hungary (1989/90) in the Art Museums of Esztergom, Tata,-Budapest, under the auspices of  Pro Helvetia. 1991: Prize, Musée Suisse du Vitrail, Romont. In the same year: Premio Agazzi, Concorso Internationale di Grafica Mapello in Bergamo.
1986-1992: Member of the Arts and Prize Committee of the City of Lucerne.
1969-1993: regular annual exhibitions of the Inner Swiss Artists Group. Since then, no further  submitted entries. Frequent activity as Jury member for exhibitions and competitions.

1993–1995
Horwer Art and Culture Prize, January 1, 1993.
1993: 1st GSB prize: Alpine Art in Switzerland, in Bad Ragaz.
Book presentation on 3 December 1993 in the Art Museum, Zug: Monograph, Franz Bucher, My Theme is Painting“  with texts by Dr. Fabrizio Brentini und Karl Iten, Verlag Gisler AG, Altdorf. 1993: Grant of the Cultural Foundation of Landis und Gyr, Zug. 1994: Curator of the Travelling Exhibition Brückenschlag, SSL, Pro Helvetia; Kunstverein und Galerie an der Finkenstrasse, München; Diocesan Museum Brünn; National Museum Danzig. Since 1995, member of the Arts Committee of the Clinic St. Anna, Hirslanden, Luzern.

1996–2007
Obwalden Arts and Culture Prize 1996.  Study-semester in New York, 1996. Monograph: Das graphische Werk 1970-2000, with texts by Dr. Niklaus Oberholzer und Markus Britschgi, Diopter Verlag, Luzern, 2001. Video, Franz Bucher – Kunst und Bau in Profan- und Sakralbauten seit 1971, edited by Damian Heini und Franz Bucher, Horw.  2001: guest lecturer in the series „Christologie“ by Professor Dr. Wolfgang Müller. (Workshop discussion with Franz Bucher (paintings and video films) : The Image of Christ in modern Art, Lucerne University, 19.06.2001.

Book publication: Franz Bucher/Romano Cuonz, Veränderungen, Explanatory text by Urs Beat Frei, Brättig Verlag, Alpnach-Dorf, 2002.
Guest lecturer in the series  „Passion“ by Dozent Henk Geuke, Hochschule für Kirchen- und Schulmusik Luzern, 10.04.2003.
2005 Admitted to the verarte.ch.

Two journeys to North Norway – in Summer 1998 and in Winter 2004, and a journey to Finland in Spring 2007 led to experiences with light, such as cannot be lived in Switzerland.

Marriage and children
Bucher married Pia Heer in 1967, and they have four children.

Selected bibliography
Books, Catalogues, Literary and Pictorial Supplements, Laudations.

1971: Franz Bucher, Supplement Internationale Musik-Festwochen in: Vaterland 12.08.1971 (6 Bucher Drawings  illustrated). Text Gedanken zur musikalischen Romantik by Dr Peter Benary.  Further illustrations in the Folgeblättern, August/September 71, from the Exhibition Franz Bucher in the Kunsthaus Luzern
1975: Franz Bucher, with texts by Heiny Widmer und Dr Karl Bühlmann, Exhibition Catalogue: Aargauer Kunsthaus Aarau
1976: Franz Bucher, with texts by Dr Christine Kamm-Kyburz und Dr Leza M. Uffer, Exhibition Catalogues: Galerie am Fischmarkt Zug und Galerie Verena Müller Bern
1981: Kunstkalender SANDOZ 1981, Basel, u.a. Franz Bucher
1982: Einen Kreuzweg gehen, Pictures by Franz Bucher, Texts by Max Huwyler, Verlag Maihof AG Luzern
1985: Franz Bucher, with a text by Dr Beat Stutzer, Katalog zur Retrospektive: Bündner Kunstmuseum Chur
1987: Max Huwyler, Föönfäischter, Stories in Dialect, Poems, Paintings by Franz Bucher,  Zytglogge Verlag Bern und Bonn
1989: Franz Bucher, Dr Sándor Láncz, Katalog zur Retrospektive: Kuny Domokos Muzeum Tata Var, Ungarn, Dr. Szatmári Sarolta und Barkózi István
1990: Franz Bucher,  Bálassa Balint Múzeum Esztergom, Ungarn, supported by Pro Helvetia, Laudatio by Dr. Pogany Ödön Gabor, Director of the National Gallery, Budapest
1991: Düsseldorf-Luzern, Franz Bucher with a text by Dr. Fabrizio Brentini, Catalogue of the exchange exhibition: Künstler-Verein Malkasten und Galerie W. u. A. Rath, Düsseldorf
1992: Luzern-Berlin, Franz Bucher, with a text by Dr. Beat Stutzer, Catalogue of the exchange exhibition:  Galerie Michael Schultz, Berlin, unterstützt durch Pro Helvetia
1993: Kulturpreis, Laudatio with text by Dr. Konrad Vogel, Gemeindehaus Horw, 01.01.1993
1993: Monography: Franz Bucher, Mein Thema ist Malerei, with texts by Dr. Fabrizio Brentini and Karl Iten, Verlag Gisler AG Altdorf, Buchvernissage 03.12.1993, Kunsthaus Zug
1996: Kulturpreis für Franz Bucher, with Text by Dr. Robert Th. Stoll for the Award Ceremony and Exhibition in the Theatre of the Alten Gymnasium Sarnen, 30.11.1996
1998: Franz Bucher, with a text by Dr. Fabrizio Brentini in: Biografisches Lexikon der Schweizer Kunst, Bd. 1, hrsg. v. Schweizerischen Institut für Kunstwissenschaft, Zürich/ Lausanne: Verlag NZZ, S. 165
2001: Obwaldner Kunstschaffen, Kunstkalender, by Ah Druck, Sarnen; including Franz Bucher
2001: Franz Bucher, Das graphische Werk 1970-2000, with texts by Dr. Niklaus Oberholzer and Markus Britschgi, Book, Diopter-Verlag, Luzern, on the Exhibitions: Tal Museum Engelberg und OKB Sarnen
2001: Video by Damian Heini: Franz Bucher, Kunst am Bau in Profan- und Sakralbauten seit 1971, edited by Franz Bucher und Damian Heini, Horw
2002: Franz Bucher – Romano Cuonz, Veränderungen, with text by Urs Beat Frei on the paintings. Book, Brattig-Verlag, Alpnach Dorf, on the Exhibitions: Museum Bruder Klaus Sachseln, Herrenhaus Grafenort, Gemeindehaus Horw
2003: AstraZeneca, Kunstkalender 2003/2004, Zug, including Franz Bucher
2005: Spiegelungen und Lichter des Nordens, Text by Dr. Roland Haltmeier on the Exhibition in the Galerie Kriens, Kriens-Luzern
2006: Franz Bucher, Booklet with text by Dr. Helmut Meier, for each Franz Bucher Exhibition from 1994 on in the Galerie Meier, Arth a/See SZ
2007: Lichter des Nordens, mit illustrations by Franz Bucher and texts by Dr. Niklaus Oberholzer, Dr. Beat Stutzer, P.D. Dr. Johannes Stückelberger, Dr. Robert Thomas Stoll, Verlag Martin Wallimann, Alpnach Dorf

Exhibitions
Detailed bibliography with list of exhibitions (1965–1993) and (1994–2000) in two monographies:
„Franz Bucher, Mein Thema ist Malerei“, Dr. Fabrizio Brentini, Verlag Gisler
„Franz Bucher, Das graphische Werk 1970-2000“, Dr. Niklaus Oberholzer, Diopter-Verlag

Selected individual exhibitions and retrospectives:
1971: Kunsthaus CH-Luzern, Internationale Musikfestwochen (Literary and Pictorial Supplement IMF)
1973: Kunsthaus CH-Luzern, Internationale Musikfestwochen (Literary and Pictorial Supplement IMF)
1975: Aargauer Kunsthaus, CH-Aarau (together with H.P. von Ah, B. Odermatt, K. Sigrist), (Catalogue)
1985: Bündner Kunstmuseum, CH-Chur (together with E. Bollin, K. Sigrist), (Catalogue)
Landenberg Sarnen
1986: Städtische Galerie Kornschütte CH-Luzern (together with G. Maurer)
1987: Gemeindegalerie Gersag, CH-Emmen
Garten Galerie-Rath, B+H.Seeling-Haus Alt-Pempelfort, D-Düsseldorf
1989: H-Budapest, Kuny Domokos Múzeum Tata Var (Catalogue)
1990: Bálassa Bàlint Múzeum, H-Esztergom, Pro Helvetia, (Catalogue)
1992/95: Galerie und Auktionshaus Dr. Peter Dolezal, CH-Zürich
1993: Kunsthaus CH-Zug, Buchvernissage 03.12.1993, Monographie „Franz Bucher, Mein Thema ist Malerei“
1994: Galerie Michael Schultz, D-Berlin, together with Paul L. Meier, Otto Heigold, Irène Wydler (Catalogue)
2000: Ziegler-Galerien, CH-Baar; from 1992 onwards, regular exhibitions
2001: Tal Museum, CH-Engelberg, Monographie, „Franz Bucher, „Das graphische Werk 1970-2000“
Obwaldner Kantonalbank (OKB), CH-Sarnen
2002: Museum Bruder Klaus, CH-Sachseln, Buch Veränderungen
Galerie Ramseyer u. Kaelin, Zytglogge-Verlag, CH-Bern, former Galerie Verena Müller; from 1992 onwards, regular exhibitions
Das graphische Werk, Galerie Zähnteschüür, CH-Oberrohrdorf AG (together with A. Brühlmeier)
2003: Galerie Meier, CH-Arth a/See, (Booklet)
Passionstuch, Kirche St. Michael, CH-Zollikerberg ZH
Veränderungen, Kunstkommission, Gemeindehaus CH-Horw
2004: Forum Dorfmatt CH-Rotkreuz, Kulturkommission Risch
2005:Veränderungen, Herrenhaus, CH-Grafenort, Painting and Drawings
Pfingstausstellung, Pauluskirche und Paulusheim, CH-Luzern, Images of Whitsun and Northern Lights, Paintings
Galerie CH-Kriens, Malerei und Originalgraphik, Spiegelungen und Lichter des Nordens, Leitung und Einführung Dr. Roland Haltmeier. From 1969 onwards, regular exhibitions. Former Galerie Krienbach
2006: Galerie Meier, CH-Arth a/See (Booklet), Malerei, Zeichnungen, Originalgrafik. From 1994 onwards, regular exhibitions
2007: Galerie in der Ev.-Luth. Diakonissenanstalt, D-Dresden E.V.
Lichter des Nordens, Tal Museum CH-Engelberg (Book, Veralg Marin Wallimann)'''

Selected group exhibitions (after 2000)
2000: Aquarelle, The Sharjah Art Museum, Sharjah, UAE
Holzschnitte der Xylon, Kornschütte, CH-Luzern (Catalogue)
ch-edition 5, kunstmesse für druckgraphik und multiples, Reithalle CH-Solothurn, (Catalogue)
Weltfestival Kunst auf Papier Kranj Ljubljana SLO, (Catalogue)
In Konklave, Kulturraum Alte Kraftwerkzentrale, CH-Giswil
Kunst und Militär, Forum der Schweizer Geschichte, CH-Schwyz, (Catalogue)
2001: Croix de bois, Gravures et dessins, Foundation du Château de CH-Gruyères
Fratelli Agazzi, Art Damer, Presezzo/ Bergamo – Italy, Associazione Culturale Agazzi Ars, (Catalogue)
Salon International du livre, CH-Genève
Bilder des Kreuzweges : Franz Bucher, Texts: Julian Dillier, Organ: Franz  Schaffner, Reformierte Kirche, CH-Zug (Folder)
tabledance, Kunstpanorama CH-Luzern
Holzschnitt heute, Kulturverein Mühlestall CH-Allschwil
Kreuze der Gegenwart, Panorama CH-Einsiedeln, (Catalogue)
Berge  und Rettung SAC, säntis der berg, CH-Säntis, (Catalogue)
Das Selbstporträt, Kunsthaus,  D-Erfurt, (Catalogue)
Altes Bad CH-Pfäfers, Verein für Originalgraphik Zürich
Galerie mMzzara, Riehen
Birsfelder Grafik-Sammlung, CH-Birsfelder Museum
World festival of art on paper, Liublijana, Slovenia, (Catalogue)
Kernser Kulturherbst 2001 In Kubus, CH-Kerns
Festival de la Gravure, Maison de la Culture, galerie municipale de la Ville de Diekirch-Luxembourg, (Book)
Gorilla Call, Kunstpanorama, CH-Luzern
2002: Associazione Culturale Agazzi, Presezzo/ Bergamo, Italy, (Catalogue)
Fifa World Cup Korea/ Japan. New Generation Artists or 2002 Intern. Flag Art
Festival, Seoul, South Korea, (Book)
EXPO, 02, Wasser, Schöpfung-Parastation, Temple, CH-Yverdon-les-Bains  (Literary and Pictorial Supplement)
Contemporains Schweizer Glaskunst zum Thema „2“,  Schweizerisches Museum für Glasmalerei, CH-Romont, (Cards)
Bergwelt 2002, Galerie Kunstsammlung Unterseen, Stadthaus, CH-Interlaken, (Catalogue)
Kunstlandschaft Schweiz, kulturgucker, D-Berlin/ Neuköln
Festival Kunst der Stille, Europäische Medien- und Event-Akademie, D- Baden-Baden
3. Mitteleuropäische Zeichnungsbiennale Pilsen 2002, Westböhmisches Museum, Tschechische Republik, (Catalogue)
Bibliophile Editionen, Galerie Art + Vision, CH-Bern
Festival de la Gravure, Maison de la Culture, Diekirch-Luxembourg (Book)
Austauschprojekt, Hochschule für Grafik und Buchkunst, D-Leipzig
2003: Buch Basel 2003, Edition Vogelsperger, Messe, CH-Basel
Bergwelt 2003, GSB, Kongress-Saal, CH-Grindelwald (Catalogue)
Festival de la Gravure, Maison de la Culture, Diekirch-Luxembourg (Book)
Internationale Triennale für Originalgrafik, CH-Grenchen (Catalogue)
20 Künstler feiern 20 Jahre Z-Galerie, Maria und Willy Ziegler, CH-Baar
Swiss olympic, Haus des Sportes, CH-Bern
Vitrea dedicata,Musée Suisse du Vitrail, CH-Romont, Schweizer Glasmalerei-Museum, 13.12.03-14.03.04
2004: 04/04/04 = 50/50/50, Galerie Roland Aphold, Art u. Edition, CH-Allschwil-Basel, Art D-Karlsruhe
Einsichten, Museum Bruder Klaus CH-Sachseln
Kunstkoordinate 2004, Turbine, CH-Giswil
IV. International Biennial of Drawing,  Pilsen 2004, Museum of West Bohemia in CZ-Pilsen (Catalogue)
Festival de la Gravure, Diekirch, Luxembourg, Maison de la Culture, galerie municipale de la Ville de Diekirch (Book)
4th International Graphic Triennale Prague, Tschechische Republik (Catalogue)
Premio Cosmè Tura 2004, Galleria Casa Editrice „Alba“, I-Ferrara (Book)
Jubiläum! 10 Jahre Galerie Adrian Bleisch, CH-Arbon
Exposition Anniversaire, 20 ans Trace Ecart, Galerie Trace Ecart, J. et H. Cesa, CH-Bulle
2005: THE ARTCARD, Sharjah Art Museum, Sharjah Art Museum, United Arab Emirates
dreifach, neue Holzschnitte der Xylon aus Deutschland, Österreich und der Schweiz, Wanderausstellung 05/06 in die Museen von CH-Winterthur: Gewerbemuseum, A-St. Pölten: Niederösterreichisches Dokumentationszentrum für Moderne Kunst, D-Reutlingen: Kunstmuseum Spendhaus (Catalogue)
Glas, Verarte, in der offenen Kirche Elisabethen, CH-Basel (Catalogue)
Bergwelt 2005, Museum Bickel, CH-Walenstadt (Catalogue)
Ein Kreuz für das 21. Jahrhundert, Diözesanmuseum, Dombergmuseum, D-Freising-München (Catalogue)
2006: Xylon, Wanderausstellung: A-Mistelbach/ Wien, im Barockschlössl Mistelbach; Bezirksmuseum Schloss Landeck. Neue Sächsische  Galerie D-Chemnitz. Xylon-Museum + Werkstätten, D-Schwetzingen, (Catalogue)
Auf der Suche nach dem Licht der Welt, Kabinettscheiben, Wanderausstellung in St. Kilian in D-Erftstadt und weiteren Institutionen und Museen Deutschlands (Book)
Ein Kreuz für das 21. Jahrhundert, Wanderausstellung, Kloster Hegne, D-Allenspach-Hegne (Catalogue)
Festival de la Gravure 2006, Maison de la Culture, Diekirch-Luxembourg (Book)
Das Ding mit dem Tod, Kunstshow im KuZeB in CH-Bremgarten
17. Internationale Triennale für Originaldruckgrafik, CH-Grenchen (Catalogue)
Xylon Holzschnitt aktuell, Galerie im Stadthaus, CH-Opfikon
2007: Bergwelt 2007, Alpines Museum, CH-Zermatt (Catalogue)
Xylon, Sektion Schweiz, Museum Bickel, CH-Walenstadt
Ein Kreuz für das 21. Jahrhundert, Wanderausstellung, Stadtmuseum, D-Bad Soden am Taunus (Catalogue)

Folders
1965: freie grafik, a. knafl, h. giger, f. bucher, redaktion/verlag, a. knafl, thalwil, b. dünner, luzern
1974: Ohne Titel, Steindruck, Druck Larese ErkerPress, St. Gallen, Kunstmappe
Franz Bucher, Fritz Wotruba, Eugen Hotz, Werner Hofmann, hrsg. Zuger Kunstgesellschaft
1975: Ohne Worte, Aquatinta, zusammen mit andern, hrsg. v. Kanton Zug (Kantonsschule), Zug 1975
1977: Bergtektonik IV, Aquatinta-Radierung, in: Mappe für Geny Hotz von seinen Freunden, zusammen mit andern,
hrsg: v. Freunden von Geny Hotz, Zug 1977
1978: Xylon 78, Kunstmappe der Vereinigung Xylon, Holzschnitte, zusammen mit andern, hrsg. v. der Xylon, Zürich, 1978
1981: Xylon 55, Franz Bucher, Holzschnitte, hrsg. v. der Xylon, Zürich/Berlin 1981
1982: Fünfzehn Stationen, 15 Holzschnitte von Franz Bucher, Horw, Gedichte von Julian Dillier, Basel, Druck Martin Wallimann, Alpnach, Edition Horw 1982
Stationen, 4 Vernis mou von Franz Bucher, Gedicht von Julian Dillier, hrsg.v. Edition Vogelsperger (= Mappe 5), Birsfelden 1982
Xylon 82 Kunstmappe der Vereinigung Xylon, Holzschnitte, zusammen mit andern, hrsg. v. der Xylon, Zürich 1982
Förderblatt der Xylon, 1982
1989: Schöpfung, 7 Holzschnitte von Franz Bucher, Text by Beat Stutzer, hrsg. v. Edition Vogelsperger (=Mappe 13), Birsfelden 1989
1993: Abraxas, Holzschnitte von Xylon-Mitgliedern
1999: Energiefeld See, 4 Farbholzschnitte von Franz Bucher, Text by Fabrizio Brentini, hrsg. v. Edition Vogelsperger (= Mappe 15), Basel 1999
2003: Spiegelung, 4 Farbholzschnitte von Franz Bucher, Text by Robert Stoll, hrsg. v. Edition Vogelsperger (= Mappe 17), Basel 2003
2006: Lichtungen, 4 Farbholzschnitte von Franz Bucher, Gedicht von Romano Cuonz, hrsg. v. Edition Vogelsperger(= Mappe 18), Basel 2006
2007: Xylon, Holzschnittmappe Bodensee, zusammen mit andern, hrsg. v. der Xylon, Bern 2007

Awards
1972: Swiss Federal Art Award (also won in 1974 and 1975)
1975: Exhibition Prize with Certificate of Honour: Kanton Schwyz seen through the eyes of Swiss Artists, in Schwyz.
1975: Admitted to the Sektion Zentralschweiz der Visarte and in
1976: Admitted to the Xylon CH, International Association of Woodcutters.
1978: Admitted to the Working Group of the St. Luke's Society of Switzerland (SSL).
1979: Premio Lario di pitture e grafica in Como.
1988: Premio Milano Capitale dell’Arte – Artista dell’ Anno 1988,  Istituto d’Arte Contemporanea Milano.
1990: Admitted to the Gesellschaft Schweizericher Bergmaler (GSB).
1991: Prize, Musée Suisse du Vitrail, Romont.
1991: Premio Agazzi, Concorso Internationale di Grafica Mapello in Bergamo.
1993: Horwer Art and Culture Prize,
1993: 1st GSB prize: Alpine Art in Switzerland, in Bad Ragaz.
1996: Obwalden Arts and Culture Prize

References

External links
 
 www.galeriepeter.ch

1940 births
Living people
People from Obwalden
Swiss artists